Prince Rostislav Romanov may refer to following Russian princes: 
Prince Rostislav Alexandrovich of Russia (1902–1978), son of Grand Duke Alexander Mikhailovich and Xenia Alexandrovna of Russia
Prince Rostislav Romanov (born 1985), grandson of Prince Rostislav Alexandrovich